Highway 344 (AR 344, Ark. 344, and Hwy. 344) is an east–west state highway in Columbia County. The route of  begins at US Highway 82 (US 82) and runs east to US 371 near Magnolia. The route is maintained by the Arkansas State Highway and Transportation Department (AHTD).

Route description
Highway 344 begins at US 82 in western Columbia County and runs southeast through pine forest typical of the Arkansas Timberlands. The route crosses Lake Columbia, a bayou  created by the extremely slow moving Beech Creek. Near the lake, Highway 344 has access to Beech Creek Landing and C. Maurice Lewis Jr. Landing, both owned and maintained by the Arkansas Game and Fish Commission. Continuing southeast, the route passes through Kilgore Lodge and intersects with county highways before terminating at US 371 west of Magnolia.

History
The route was created by the Arkansas State Highway Commission on November 23, 1966 between US 82 and Highway 132 along its present alignment. Highway 132 was redesignated as US 371 in 1994.

Major intersections

See also

References

External links

344
Transportation in Columbia County, Arkansas